A list of films produced in Italy in 1982 (see 1982 in film):

References

Footnotes

Sources

External links
Italian films of 1982 at the Internet Movie Database

1982
Films
Italian